In molecular biology, the Macro domain (often also written macrodomain) or A1pp domain is a module of about 180 amino acids which can bind ADP-ribose, an NAD metabolite, or related ligands. Binding to ADP-ribose can be either covalent or non-covalent: in certain cases it is believed to bind non-covalently, while in other cases (such as Aprataxin) it appears to bind both non-covalently through a zinc finger motif, and covalently through a separate region of the protein.

Function 
The domain was described originally in association with the ADP-ribose 1-phosphate (Appr-1-P)-processing activity (A1pp) of the yeast YBR022W protein and called A1pp. However, the domain has been renamed Macro as it is the C-terminal domain of mammalian core histone macro-H2A. Macro domain proteins can be found in eukaryotes, in (mostly pathogenic) bacteria, in archaea and in ssRNA viruses, such as coronaviruses, Rubella and Hepatitis E viruses. In vertebrates the domain occurs in e.g. histone macroH2A, predicted poly-ADP-ribose polymerases (PARPs) and B aggressive lymphoma (BAL) protein.

ADP-ribosylation of proteins is an important post-translational modification that occurs in a variety of biological processes, including DNA repair, regulation of transcription, chromatin biology, maintenance of genomic stability, telomere dynamics, cell differentiation and proliferation, necrosis and apoptosis, and long-term memory formation. The Macro domain recognises the ADP-ribose nucleotide and in some cases poly-ADP-ribose, and is thus a high-affinity ADP-ribose-binding module found in a number of otherwise unrelated proteins. ADP-ribosylation of DNA is relatively uncommon and has only been described for a small number of toxins that include pierisin, scabin and DarT. The Macro domain from the antitoxin DarG of the toxin-antitoxin system DarTG, both binds and removes the ADP-ribose modification added to DNA by the toxin DarT. The Macro domain from human, macroH2A1.1, binds an NAD metabolite O-acetyl-ADP-ribose.

Structure 
The 3D structure of the Macro domain describes a mixed alpha/beta fold of a mixed beta sheet sandwiched between four helices with the ligand-binding pocket lies within the fold. Several Macro domain-only domains are shorter than the structure of AF1521 and lack either the first strand or the C-terminal helix 5. Well conserved residues form a hydrophobic cleft and cluster around the AF1521-ADP-ribose binding site.

See also 
 ADP-ribosylation

References 

Protein domains